Rubens Otoni Gomide (born 6 February 1956) is a Brazilian politician and university professor. He has spent his political career representing Goiás, having served as state representative since 2003.

Personal life
Otoni graduated with a degree in mechanical engineering from the Federal University of Uberlândia, and also has a degree in law from the Law School of Anápolis, and is currently a professor at UniEvangélica.

Political career
Otoni voted against the impeachment of then-president Dilma Rousseff, and was one of her biggest supporters in congress. Otoni voted in opposition to the 2017 Brazilian labor reform, and would vote in favor of a corruption investigation into Rousseff's successor Michel Temer.

Otoni is a critic of Sérgio Moro's anti-corruption campaign.

References

1956 births
Living people
Brazilian educators
Members of the Chamber of Deputies (Brazil) from Goiás
People from Goiás
Workers' Party (Brazil) politicians